Zephyrium or Zephyrion was a town of the Chersonesus Taurica (modern Crimean Peninsula), mentioned by Pliny the Elder.

Its site is unlocated.

References

Greek colonies in Crimea
Former populated places in Crimea
Ancient Crimea